Maimun Saleh Airport  is a small airport with a runway length of  and altitude of  in Sabang, Pulau Weh, Indonesia. It is situated on the island right above the northern tip of Sumatra in the Andaman Sea. It is part of the Sabang city in Aceh province. This airport was named after Indonesian Air Force pilot Maimun Saleh, who died in a plane crash at Bogor on August, 1952. It is considered to be Indonesia's westernmost and northernmost airport.

This airport is part of Indonesian Navy facility such as El Tari Airport. The nearest airport to Sabang is Sultan Iskandarmuda Airport, which is located in nearby Banda Aceh; it serves both international and domestic flights.

References

Airports in Aceh